Yuval is a Hebrew first name. It means stream, brook, or tributary. In the Hebrew Bible, Yuval (also Jubal) was the son of Lamech and Adah, a brother of Jabal, a descendant of Cain. He was named as the ancestor of all who played the lyre and pipe (see book of Genesis 4:20-21).
Yuval is known as the father of music.

In Israel, Yuval (Yooval or Uval) is a common male and female name. While the name has Biblical origins, it does not have a strong religious connotation.

People
 Yuval Avidor (born 1986), Israeli football player 
 Yuval Aviv (born 1947), Israeli writer
 Yuval Banay (born 1962), Israeli musician
 Yuval Cherlow (born 1957), Israeli rabbi
 Yuval Dayan (born 1994), Israeli singer
 Yuval Diskin (born 1956), Israeli intelligence officer
 Yuval Elizur (born 1927), Israeli journalist 
 Yuval Filo (born 1998), Israeli Olympic rhythmic gymnast
 Yuval Flicker (born 1955), American mathematician
 Yuval Freilich (born 1995), Israeli épée fencer, 2019 European Epee Champion
 Yuval Fenichel (born 1982), ex-IDF Israeli-Canadian NSOC Team Lead, Toronto
 Yuval Fuchs (born 1961), Israeli diplomat
 Yuval Gabay (born 1963), Israeli drummer, member of Soul Coughing
 Yuval Harari (born 1976), Israeli historian
 Yuval Levin (born 1977), American writer
 Yuval Naimy (born 1985), Israeli basketball player
 Yuval Ne'eman (1925–2006), Israeli physicist, politician, and President of Tel Aviv University
 Yuval Neria (born 1952), Israeli psychologist
 Yuval Peres (born 1963), Israeli mathematician
 Yuval Pick (born 1970), Israeli dancer and choreographer
 Yuval Rotem (born 1959), Israeli diplomat
 Yuval Segal (born 1971), Israeli actor and comedian
 Yuval Semo (born 1972), Israeli actor 
 Yuval Shabtay (born 1986), Israeli football player
 Yuval Shawat (born 1989), Israeli football player
 Yuval Spungin (born 1987), Israeli football player
 Yuval Steinitz (born 1958), Israeli politician
 Yuval Sznajderman (born 2002), Israeli basketball player 
 Yuval Tal (born 1965), Israeli businessman
 Yuval Yairi (born 1961), Israeli artist
 Yuval Zaliouk (born 1939), Israeli conductor
 Yuval Zamir (1963-2011), Israeli actor
 Yuval Zellner (born 1978), Israeli politician

Hebrew masculine given names